International IT University or International university of information technologies  (Halyqaralyq aqparattyq tehnologııalar ýnıversıteti) - established in close collaboration with educational organization iCarnegie which represents American IT university Carnegie Mellon in 2009 by order of President of Kazakhstan. Formation of the qualified, international recognized IT specialists in Kazakhstan became the purpose of creation of a higher educational institution of a similar profile. International IT University provided with grants from the government of Kazakhstan and national 
infocommunication companies, which cover disciplines by Kazakhstan and the U.S. educational systems.

Academic activities

Bachelor specialties 
Information Systems
Computer Science and Software Engineering
Computer Science
Management in IT
Finance in IT
Electronic Journalism
Radio Engineering, Electronics and Telecommunications
Mathematical and Computer Modeling

Master's specialities 
Information Systems
Computer Science and Software Engineering
Project Management
Mathematical and Computer Modeling

iCarnegie courses 
Education in International IT University goes by education programs of iCarnegie - branch enterprise of Carnegie Mellon

High School Program Courses
 High School Program courses  - training courses for applicant's basic knowledge of programming, the main objectives of which are:
To teach applicants to program in Java
To teach to use the modern approach of object-oriented programming (OOP)
To teach to create applications with animations, sounds and control via the keyboard
Provide certificates of iCarnegie, which will be considered for admission to IITU
Provide an opportunity to work on interesting projects
Provide an opportunity to learn from an Honorary Professor with the U.S. on international standards
To teach how to create web-pages with games.

International cooperation 
International cooperation of university is carried by improving the training system in accordance with international standards, professional development of teaching staff, use of new technologies and leading practices in teaching and research activities through collaboration with foreign universities under direct contracts:

Laboratory

Huawei Cloud Computing of Innogrid 
Huawei Cloud Computing of Innogrid - on August 9, 2011 was created the laboratory of open systems and cloud computing in close cooperation between Chinese company Huawei, ICT Holding "Zerde" and International IT University. 
The main purpose of the laboratory is focused on research in the fields cloud computing, open systems using the technology Open Source.

Apple Training Center
iOS Application Development - course introduces students to the programming language Objective-C and application development for mobile devices based on iOS. At the end of the course, students will be able to develop applications and programs in Objective-C for iPhone, iPad, and other iOS devices, as well as working in a development environment Xcode. The course includes an introduction to the language of Objective-C, the application of the concepts of object-oriented programming in the development of the language, study of the development paradigm of MVC, the work of the various components in the development environment Xcode. Before the start of the course the student should be familiar with object-oriented programming, be familiar with the syntax of C-like languages and have a basic knowledge of graphic design tools, compilers and debuggers.

Mac OS X Application development- course will teach students to develop applications for the operating system Mac OS X. At the end of the course the students will experience working with Cocoa Framework and Objective-C.
Requires prior knowledge of programming language Objective-C. The course includes an overview of the platform and operating system, Mac OS X, the principles of designing application interfaces for personal computers.

Advanced Apple Development - course is designed for in-depth study of methods and means of developing applications based on Apple technology. The course includes a more detailed study of the language Objective-C, and additional third-party libraries, development environments XCode, the debugger works, methods of combining different languages and technologies with programs in Objective-C, frameworks WebKit, ParseKit, Cocoa, RestKit, writing web applications using Objective-C and XCode, architecture operating systems MacOS, Apple iOS, kernel Darwin, as well as the hardware architecture of devices Apple 
iPhone/iPad.

Microsoft Laboratory —

Social projects and activities 
Hackday Almaty 2011 - in 29–30 April 2011, in the walls of IITU was held IT-event Hackday. The event was attended by more than 500 master class listeners and 396 registered participants of the different projects in the IT sections and sections of Content and Media. In the event was announced 104 projects, of which 88 projects were submitted.

Hackday Almaty 2012 - in 28–29 April 2012, in the walls of IITU was held second IT-event Hackday 2012. In this year there were over 800 participants in different projects took part in the sections IT, Media and Content. In conjunction with IT-university partners of Hackday 2012 were:

Management 
Rector - Uskenbaeva Raisa Kabievna
Vice-Rector - Uskenbaeva Raisa Kabievna
Director of Marketing and PR - Taykenova Mayrash Gomarovna

University partners

University anthem

References 

The information in this article is based on that in its Kazakh equivalent.

External links 
The Objective-C courses by Rakhim Davletkaliyev BSc

2009 establishments in Kazakhstan
Universities in Kazakhstan
Educational institutions established in 2009